The Nanda Devi National Park and Valley of Flowers National Parks is an UNESCO World Heritage Site in Uttarakhand, India. It possesses of two core areas about 20 km apart, made up by the Nanda Devi National Park and the Valley of Flowers National Park, plus an encompassing Combined Buffer Zone.

In 1988 the site was inscribed as Nanda Devi National Park (India). In 2005 it was expanded to encompass the Valley of Flowers National Park and a larger buffer zone and it was renamed to Nanda Devi and Valley of Flowers National Parks.

The areas of the site are
  - Nanda Devi National Park core area
  - Valley of Flowers National Park core area
  - Buffer zone

References

1988 establishments in Uttar Pradesh
Protected areas established in 1988
World Heritage Sites in India
NANDA DEVI